Francis Jacobs (born February 28, 2005) is an American professional soccer player who plays as a midfielder for USL Championship side Orange County.

He became the youngest professional US soccer player in history on July 26, 2019 when he signed with Orange County Soccer Club at 14 years, four months, and 29 days old. Beforehand, Freddy Adu was the youngest professional US soccer player in history.

Club career
After playing with USSDA side Irvine Strikers, Jacobs signed with USL Championship side Orange County on August 12, 2019. At just 14 years, 4 months and 29 days old, Jacobs became the youngest professional soccer player in United States history.

Career statistics

Club

References

External links
Profile at the US Soccer Development Academy website

2005 births
Living people
People from Laguna Beach, California
American soccer players
Association football midfielders
California United Strikers FC players
Orange County SC players
National Independent Soccer Association players
USL Championship players
Soccer players from California
Sportspeople from Orange County, California